WJDB (630 AM) was an American radio station licensed to serve Thomasville, Alabama.  The station, the only AM station licensed to Thomasville, was owned by Griffin Broadcasting Corporation. Griffin Broadcasting also owns Thomasville's WJDB-FM.

It aired an adult hits music format.

History
The station was assigned the "WJDB" call sign by the Federal Communications Commission.

In November 1990, licensee WJDB Radio, Inc., reached an agreement to sell this station to Griffin Broadcasting Corporation.  The deal was approved by the FCC on January 4, 1991, and the transaction was consummated on January 31, 1991.

This station was reported silent in December 2011. (Taken from Alabama Broadcast Media Page) On May 17, 2017, the FCC informed WJDB that, as the station had been silent since at least March 5, 2016, it was in the process of cancelling the station's license; the license was canceled on June 29, 2017.

References

External links
FCC Station Search Details: DWJDB (Facility ID: 25379)
 (covering 1955-1979)

JDB
Defunct radio stations in the United States
Mass media in Clarke County, Alabama
Radio stations established in 1956
1956 establishments in Alabama
Radio stations disestablished in 2016
2016 disestablishments in Alabama
JDB